First-e was a European online bank during the Dot-com bubble of 1999–2001. The company was based in Dublin, Ireland and employed 280 people, with 250,000 customers. It operated on a licence from French bank Banque d'Escompte, an innovation that allowed it to get around the usual difficulties faced by European banking startups. It launched with €200m in funding from various institutions including Intel, Morgan Stanley and Apax Partners and initially targeted the British market with a savings interest rate 2% higher than its high-street competitors, and gained 250,000 customers.

A 2.4 billion euro merger with the Spanish online bank Uno-e was proposed 2000, but after the dotcom bubble burst in late 2000, parent company of Uno-e, BBVA called off the merger was in April 2001 and instead paid some €350m in compensation. First-e then sold its business to Direkt Anlage Bank of Germany in October 2001.

First-e was owned by the Enba group of companies, created by Gerhard Huber, Peter Phillips, Christian Kaiser, Nicholas Malcomson and Xavier Azalbert. Its Board included Sean Donlon, a former Irish ambassador to the US and the late Sir Nicholas Redmayne who was also its chairman.

See also

Egg Banking
smile.co.uk

References

External links
first-e website on the Internet Archive
Announcement of closure by Banque d'Escompte on the Internet Archive

Defunct banks of Ireland
Online companies of Ireland
1998 establishments in Ireland
2001 disestablishments in Ireland
Banks established in 1998
Banks disestablished in 2001
Online banks